Erigeron geiseri is a North American species of flowering plants in the family Asteraceae known by the common name Geiser's fleabane.

Erigeron geiseri has been found only in the southern part of the Great Plains of the United States, in the states of Oklahoma and Texas. It grows on prairies, fields, fencerows and roadsides.

Erigeron geiseri grows up to 40 cm (16 inches) tall, and produces a slender taproot. The plant sometimes produces as many as 20 flower heads per stem, each head containing  golden yellow disc florets surrounded by as many as 70 white ray florets.

References

External links

geiseri
Flora of Texas
Flora of Oklahoma
Plants described in 1947
Flora without expected TNC conservation status